Takeover Records released its second issue of 3-Way on June 28, 2005.
It was released with three bands: Takeover's own Near Miss,  Reeve Oliver,  and The Matches.  Each band has three songs on the CD. The songs included on this EP by The Matches were co produced, engineered and mixed by Mikael Johnston, founder of Mephisto Odyssey and Dresden and Johnston.

Tracks

Number 7 - Near Miss
At The Seam - Near Miss  
Now Rectify - Near Miss  
Summer - Reeve Oliver  
I Play The Sensitive Songwriter Card - Reeve Oliver  
We're All Gonna Die - Reeve Oliver  
A Girl I Know - The Matches  
Sick Little Suicide (Acoustic) - The Matches  
Shoot Me In The Smile (Acoustic) - The Matches

References

2005 compilation albums
Punk rock compilation albums